Henrik Hansen may refer to:

Henrik Hansen (wrestler) (1920-2010), Danish Olympic wrestler
Henrik Hansen (cricketer) (born 1977), Danish cricketer
Henrik Hansen (footballer) (born 1979), Danish professional football midfielder
Henrik Toft Hansen (born 1986), Danish handball player
Froggen (born 1994), the screen alias of Danish League of Legends player Henrik Hansen